Sharp Objects is the 2006 debut novel by American author Gillian Flynn. The book was first published through Shaye Areheart Books on September 26, 2006, and has subsequently been re-printed through Broadway Books. The novel follows Camille Preaker, a newspaper journalist who must return to her hometown to report on a series of brutal murders.

Characters

Main
Camille Preaker: A young journalist trying to make a better life for herself in Chicago. She has suffered for years after the death of her sister Marian at a very young age. Camille spent time in a psychiatric hospital near Chicago after years of self-harm.
Amma Crellin: Camille's 13-year-old half-sister, who is the "it girl" in the town of Wind Gap, Missouri. She lives a double life as a perfect Southern daughter to Adora and also the mean girl to the rest of the town. She terrorizes those living in the town as she attempts to rule everyone around her.
Adora Crellin: Camille and Amma's mother, a strict woman who rarely shows any type of positive emotion towards Camille, and treats Amma like a baby doll. Her family is the wealthiest in the area and owns many of the businesses in the surrounding areas, and she has a firm hold on the social atmosphere of Wind Gap.

Supporting
Detective Richard Willis: A detective from Kansas City homicide division tasked to investigate the crimes happening in Wind Gap.
Alan Crellin: Adora's husband, Amma and Marian's biological father, and Camille's stepfather. He is well reserved, quiet and believes whatever Adora tells him, even if it is a lie. He lets Amma do everything she pleases and provides whatever she asks for.
Ann Nash and Natalie Keene: Two innocent victims of a gruesome crime in Wind Gap being investigated by Camille Preaker and Detective Willis. Ann, 9, is the first victim, and Natalie, 10, is the second.
Chief Vickery: Chief of police in Wind Gap who asked for Detective Willis' help in investigating the crimes.
John Keene: Natalie's 18-year-old brother. He is one of the main suspects in the murders, and his alibi during the disappearance of his sister sounds suspicious to the police and townspeople.
Frank Curry: Camille's editor-in-chief, boss and friend. He encourages Camille to return to Wind Gap to cover a story of unresolved murders in her hometown.
Eileen Curry:  Frank's wife and a surrogate mother to Camille. Eileen often corresponds with Camille over the phone while she's in Wind Gap.

Synopsis
Camille Preaker works as a journalist at  The Daily Post, a small newspaper in Chicago. She is not particularly satisfied with the job, which includes writing stories about human neglect, murders, and crime. Camille gets along somewhat well with her boss Frank Curry, who supported her during a recent hospitalization due to self-harm. Camille has carved many words onto her body—having previously hallucinated them on her skin. Curry gives her a reporting assignment to her hometown of Wind Gap, Missouri, where one girl has been murdered and a second is missing.

Once in Wind Gap, Camille manages to gain some information about the crimes from the townspeople, including the family of Ann Nash, the murdered girl. The local police are not particularly forthcoming about the murder, but the town sheriff, Chief Vickery, divulges to Camille off the record that he believes that the murderer is a Wind Gap native, not a stranger. Soon the body of the missing girl, Natalie Keene, is discovered in an alley in town. Both she and Ann were strangled and had all of their teeth removed. The police are baffled by the crimes. Camille publishes a story, only for Curry to ask her to remain in Wind Gap for further coverage of the murders.

While there, Camille reconnects with her estranged mother Adora and 13-year-old half-sister Amma. Camille never had a good relationship with her mother, as Adora always preferred Camille's younger sister Marian, who died due to an unspecified illness when Camille was young. Amma, who was born after Marian's death, has grown into a spoiled teen who behaves like a young child in front of her mother to hide her drinking, drug use, and promiscuity. Camille connects with a handsome Kansas City detective, Richard Willis, sent to investigate the potential of a serial killer.

As Camille continues to investigate, she begins a sexual relationship with Richard. During each encounter with him, Camille refuses to remove her clothes out of fear that he will reject her after he sees her scars. Camille and Amma begin to grow closer. After attending a party with her sister where the two of them get drunk and take drugs, Camille wakes to find Adora caring for her, giving her pills that make her sick. Camille is horrified to discover that Adora does this to Amma frequently, and realizes that Marian's illness was not hers, but Adora's—Münchausen syndrome by proxy. After some investigation, Camille finds a letter written by a nurse caring for Marian that shows that the nurse had these same suspicions. Camille also discovers that Richard believes Adora to be responsible for the murders of Ann and Natalie. She returns to her mother's home, where Adora poisons Camille and tries to care for Camille's wounds while bathing her.

Camille passes out, but awakens to find Richard and the police arresting her mother. Richard is horrified to see the extent of her scars. This ends their relationship, despite his earlier claims of genuinely falling for her. Adora is charged with the murders of Marian and the two girls, and Amma is sent to Chicago to live with Camille. Amma initially seems to be healing from the abuse she suffered at Adora's hands, but soon after she begins attending a girls' school in Chicago, a classmate is discovered murdered, having had six of her teeth pulled. It is then revealed that while Adora did kill Marian, Amma murdered Ann Nash and Natalie Keene, in part because she was jealous of the attention Adora was giving the girls. Amma is later arrested for her crimes. Distraught, Camille cuts herself again, but is stopped by Curry and his wife, who take her in as their own daughter. The story ends with Camille learning to be cared for as a child and a daughter for the first time.

Production
As she was working as a reporter for Entertainment Weekly while she was writing Sharp Objects, Flynn wrote the book predominantly on nights and weekends, a few hours at a time. While writing Sharp Objects, Flynn found that it was initially difficult to maintain the book's "moist", "gothic tone", as she "didn't want it to be EW bouncy."

Reception
Critical reception has been mostly positive. Kirkus Reviews gave a favorable review for Sharp Objects, calling it "Piercingly effective and genuinely terrifying." The Star-Herald also gave a positive review, praising the book's gradual revelations.

Awards
 New Blood Fiction Dagger from the Crime Writers' Association (2007, won)
 Ian Fleming Steel Dagger from the Crime Writers' Association (2007, won)
 Duncan Lawrie Dagger from the Crime Writers' Association (2007, nominated)

Adaptations
In 2008, British director Andrea Arnold was reported to be directing an adaptation of the novel for French production company Pathé, but the project never materialized.

The film rights to Sharp Objects were purchased by Blumhouse Productions and Alliance Films in 2012 with Flynn working as the series' screenwriter. By 2014 Flynn's role had changed to executive producer, alongside Jason Blum and Charles Layton, for a television miniseries adaptation for Entertainment One. Marti Noxon wrote the pilot script, combining this role with that of show runner. A straight-to-series-order of eight one-hour episodes, also titled Sharp Objects, was filmed in various California locations and in Barnesville, Georgia in March 2017. The series, directed by Jean-Marc Vallée, was premiered in July 2018, with Amy Adams starring as Camille Preaker.

References

External links
 

American mystery novels
2006 American novels
Self-harm in fiction
Filicide in fiction
American novels adapted into television shows
Novels set in Missouri
2006 debut novels
Novels about alcoholism
Shaye Areheart Books books